Richfield Township is one of twenty-two townships in Adams County, Illinois, United States. As of the 2010 census, its population was 411 and it contained 183 housing units.

Geography

Unincorporated towns
 Richfield

Cemeteries
The township contains seven cemeteries: Baker Family, Franks, Klarner, Lock Family, Potter, Rice Family and Shiloh.

Major highways
  Illinois State Route 104

Airports and landing strips
 Dale A Klassing Airport

Demographics
As of the 2020 census there were 407 people, 43 households, and 30 families residing in the township. The racial makeup of the township was 96.56% White, 0.00% African American, 0.25% Native American, 0.00% Asian, 0.00% Pacific Islander, 0.25% from other races, and 2.95% from two or more races. Hispanic or Latino of any race were 0.74% of the population.

There were 43 households, out of which 23.30% had children under the age of 18 living with them, 69.77% were married couples living together, 0.00% had a female householder with no spouse present, and 30.23% were non-families. 30.20% of all households were made up of individuals, and 0.00% had someone living alone who was 65 years of age or older. The average household size was 2.05 and the average family size was 2.50.

The township's age distribution consisted of 11.4% under the age of 18, none from 18 to 24, 21.6% from 25 to 44, 14.8% from 45 to 64, and 52.3% who were 65 years of age or older. The median age was 78.0 years. For every 100 females, there were 193.3 males. For every 100 females age 18 and over, there were 160.0 males.

The median income for a household in the township was $71,063 and  the per capita income for the township was $35,788. None of the population was below the poverty line.

School districts
 Barry Community Unit School District 1
 Liberty Community Unit School District 2
 Payson Community Unit School District 1

Political districts
 Illinois' 18th congressional district
 State House District 93
 State Senate District 47

References
 
 United States Census Bureau 2007 TIGER/Line Shapefiles
 United States National Atlas

External links
 List of Adams County township trustees
 City-Data.com
 Illinois State Archives

Townships in Adams County, Illinois
1849 establishments in Illinois
Populated places established in 1849
Townships in Illinois